Mark Stone (born June 17, 1957) is an American lawyer and politician who served in the California State Assembly. He is a Democrat who represented the 29th Assembly District, which encompassed parts of the northern Central Coast.

Prior to being elected to the Assembly in 2012, he was a Santa Cruz County Supervisor and served on the Scotts Valley School Board prior to that.

2014 California State Assembly

2016 California State Assembly

2018 California State Assembly

2020 California State Assembly

References

External links 
 
 Campaign website

County supervisors in California
Democratic Party members of the California State Assembly
Living people
1957 births
People from Santa Barbara, California
People from Scotts Valley, California
University of California, Berkeley alumni
Santa Clara University School of Law alumni
21st-century American politicians
English Channel swimmers